"Always Be with You" is a song by Australian group Human Nature.  It was released as the first and only single from their first greatest hits album Here & Now: The Best of Human Nature (2001). The song peaked at No. 29 in Australia.

Track listing
CD single (672115.2)
 "Always Be with You" – 3:47
 "Always Be with You" (Club Mix) – 6:22
 "Always Be with You" (Club Radio Mix) – 4:08
 "If I Only Had the Heart" – 3:46
 "Counting Down" – 3:24

Charts

References

External links
Human Nature - Always Be With You

Human Nature (band) songs
2001 songs
2001 singles
Sony Music Australia singles
Songs written by Michael Tierney (musician)
Songs written by Andrew Tierney
Song recordings produced by Ray Hedges